Liberal Pride is an Australian organisation for LGBT conservatism & liberalism in the Australia It is affiliated and is the official LGBT wing of the Liberal Party of Australia. The current branch currently maintains a presence in the two most populous cities of Australia, Melbourne and Sydney.

The group campaigns for LGBT rights alongside the main political beliefs and policies of the Liberal Party, which it promotes within the Party, LGBT community, and wider public. Besides this Liberal Pride campaigns for LGBT candidates, including through its Candidates' Fund and attends Pride events across the country.

Activity 
Liberal Pride have been present at social meet ups, meals and drinks and Pride events across the country. Liberal Pride hosts many fundraising events across the eastern shore for members of both the House of Representatives  and Senate.

Fund 
The Liberal Pride group disburse campaign funds in support of LGBT+ candidates.

Past Presidents 
 Trevor Evans
 Ben Greenwood
 Heath Wilson

Patrons 
Liberal Pride patron and members:

 Senator Jane Hume - Liberal Pride Patron
 Senator Simon Birmingham
 Senator James Paterson
 John Pesutto MP
 Georgie Crozier MLC
 Matt Bach MLC
 Jess Wilson MP
 Sam Groth MP
 David Southwick MP
 James Newbury MP
 Nick McGowan MLC
 David Davis MP
 Tim Wilson
 Dr. Katie Allen

See also 

 LGBT rights in Australia

References 

LGBT conservatism
LGBT liberalism
Liberal Party of Australia